Gbach is a rural locality (a village) in Belogorskoye Rural Settlement of Kholmogorsky District, Arkhangelsk Oblast, Russia. The population was 648 as of 2010.

Geography 
Gbach is located on the Pinega River, 92 km east of Kholmogory (the district's administrative centre) by road. Kuzomen is the nearest rural locality.

References 

Rural localities in Kholmogorsky District